Echinolittorina is a genus of small sea snails, marine gastropod molluscs in the family Littorinidae, the winkles.

Species 

According to the World Register of Marine Species (WoRMS), the following species with valid names are included within the genus Echinolittorina :

 Echinolittorina albicarinata (McLean, 1970)
 Echinolittorina angustior (Mörch, 1876)
 Echinolittorina apicina (Menke, 1851)
 Echinolittorina arabica (El Assal, 1990)
 Echinolittorina aspera (Philippi, 1846)
 Echinolittorina atrata (C.B. Adams, 1852)
 Echinolittorina australis (Gray, 1826)
 Echinolittorina austrotrochoides Reid, 2007
 Echinolittorina biangulata (Martens, 1897)
 Echinolittorina caboverdensis Reid, 2011
 Echinolittorina cecillei (Philippi, 1851)
 Echinolittorina cinerea (Pease, 1869)
 Echinolittorina conspersa (Philippi, 1847)
 Echinolittorina dilatata (d'Orbigny, 1842)
 Echinolittorina dubiosa (C.B. Adams, 1852)
 Echinolittorina feejeensis (Reeve, 1857)
 Echinolittorina fuscolineata (Reid, 2002)
 Echinolittorina granosa (Philippi, 1845)
 Echinolittorina hawaiiensis (Rosewater & Kadolsky, 1981)
 Echinolittorina helenae (E.A. Smith, 1890)
 Echinolittorina interrupta (C.B. Adams in Philippi, 1847)
 Echinolittorina jamaicensis (C.B. Adams, 1850)
 Echinolittorina lemniscata (Philippi, 1846)
 Echinolittorina leucosticta (Philippi, 1847)
 Echinolittorina lineolata (d’Orbigny, 1840)
 Echinolittorina malaccana (Philippi, 1847)
 Echinolittorina marisrubri Reid, 2007
 Echinolittorina marquesensis Reid, 2007
 Echinolittorina melanacme (E.A. Smith, 1876)
 Echinolittorina meleagris (Beck in Potiez & Michaud, 1838)
 Echinolittorina mespillum (Mühlfeld, 1824)
 Echinolittorina miliaris (Quoy & Gaimard, 1833)
 Echinolittorina millegrana (Philippi, 1848)
 Echinolittorina modesta (Philippi, 1846)
 Echinolittorina natalensis (Philippi, 1847)
 Echinolittorina novaezelandiae (Reeve, 1857)
 Echinolittorina omanensis Reid, 2007
 Echinolittorina parcipicta (Carpenter, 1864)
 Echinolittorina pascua (Rosewater, 1970)
 Echinolittorina paytensis (Philippi, 1847)
 Echinolittorina penicillata (Carpenter, 1864)
 Echinolittorina peregrinator Reid, 2011
 Echinolittorina peruviana (Lamarck, 1822)
 Echinolittorina philippinensis Reid, 2007
 Echinolittorina placida Reid, 2009
 Echinolittorina porcata (Philippi, 1846)
 Echinolittorina pulchella (Dunker, 1845)
 Echinolittorina punctata (Gmelin, 1791)
 Echinolittorina quadricincta (Mühlfeld, 1824)
 Echinolittorina radiata (Souleyet in Eydoux & Souleyet, 1852)
 Echinolittorina reticulata (Anton, 1838)
 Echinolittorina santelenae (Reid, 2002)
 Echinolittorina soroziczac Reid, 2011
 Echinolittorina subnodosa (Philippi, 1847)
 Echinolittorina sundaica (van Regteren Altena, 1945)
 Echinolittorina tenuistriata (Reid, 2002)
 Echinolittorina tricincta Reid, 2007
 Echinolittorina tuberculata (Menke, 1828)
 Echinolittorina vermeiji (Bandel & Kadolsky, 1982)
 Echinolittorina vidua (Gould, 1859)
 Echinolittorina wallaceana Reid, 2007
 Echinolittorina ziczac (Gmelin, 1791)

Species brought into synonymy 
 Echinolittorina fernandezensis (Rosewater, 1870): synonym of Austrolittorina fernandezensis (Rosewater, 1970)
 Echinolittorina galapagiensis (Stearns, 1892): synonym of  Echinolittorina lemniscata (Philippi, 1846)
 Echinolittorina pyramidalis (Quoy & Gaimard, 1833): synonym of Nodilittorina pyramidalis (Quoy & Gaimard, 1833)
 Echinolittorina trochoides (Gray, 1839): synonym of Echinolittorina pascua (Rosewater, 1970)
 Echinolittorina unifasciata (Gray, 1826): synonym of Austrolittorina unifasciata (Gray, 1826)

References

 Habe & Kosuge, 1966) Reid D.G. (2007) The genus Echinolittorina Habe, 1956 (Gastropoda: Littorinidae) in the Indo-West Pacific Ocean. Zootaxa 1420: 1-161.

Further reading
 S. T. Williams, and D. G. Reid, Speciation and Diversity on Tropical Rocky Shores: a Global Phylogeny of Snails of the Genus Echinolittorina, Evolution,  Volume 58, Issue 10, pages 2227–2251, October 2004
 David G. Reid, Kalpana Lal, Jacqueline Mackenzie-Dodds, Fontje Kaligis, D. Timothy J. Littlewood, Suzanne T. Williams : Comparative phylogeography and species boundaries in Echinolittorina snails in the central Indo-West Pacific,  Journal of Biogeography,  Volume 33, Issue 6, pages 990–1006, June 2006

Littorinidae